Bernay-Neuvy-en-Champagne is a commune in the Sarthe department in the region of Pays de la Loire in north-western France. It was established on 1 January 2019 by merger of the former communes of Neuvy-en-Champagne (the seat) and Bernay-en-Champagne.

See also
Communes of the Sarthe department

References

Communes of Sarthe